Another Earth is the second album by saxophonist Gary Bartz which was recorded in 1968 and released on the Milestone label.

Reception

Scott Yanow of Allmusic commented: "this adventurous music is quite colorful and always holds one's interest".

Track listing 
All compositions by Gary Bartz except as indicated
 "Another Earth"  - 23:50
 "Dark Nebula" - 5:07
 "UFO" - 4:52
 "Lost in the Stars" (Kurt Weill) - 4:06
 "Perihelion and Aphelion" - 3:48

Personnel 
Gary Bartz - alto saxophone
Charles Tolliver - trumpet (track 1)
Pharoah Sanders - tenor saxophone (track 1) 
Stanley Cowell - piano
Reggie Workman - bass
Freddie Waits - drums

References 

Gary Bartz albums
1969 albums
Milestone Records albums
Albums produced by Orrin Keepnews